In military terms, 57th Division may refer to:


Infantry divisions
 57th Division (2nd Formation)(People's Republic of China) 
 57th Infantry Division (Wehrmacht) 
 57th Infantry Division Lombardia (Kingdom of Italy)
 57th Mountain Division,  Leimakhong, Manipur III Corps (India) 
 57th Division (Imperial Japanese Army)
 57th Infantry Division (Russian Empire) 
 57th Rifle Division (RSFSR)
 57 Division (Sri Lanka)
 57th Guards Rifle Division (Soviet Union, later 57th Guards Motor Rifle Division)
 57th Rifle Division (Soviet Union)
 57th Infantry Division (Turkey)
 57th (2nd West Lancashire) Division (United Kingdom)

Aviation divisions
 57th Air Division (United States)

Cavalry divisions 
 57th Cavalry Division (Soviet Union)

See also 
 57th Regiment (disambiguation)